Jabinad (also Romanized as Jabīnad and Jabyand) is a village in Almalu Rural District, Nazarkahrizi District, Hashtrud County, East Azerbaijan Province, Iran. At the 2006 census, its population was 164, in 30 families.

References 

Towns and villages in Hashtrud County